The 2018 CONCACAF Girls' U-15 Championship was an association football tournament that took take place in Bradenton, Florida during August 2018.

Teams

Portugal and Northern Ireland were invitees.

Venues

All matches took place at the IMG Academy campus in Bradenton, Florida.

Group stage

Tiebreakers

The following tiebreaking criteria were established by CONCACAF:
Greatest number of points obtained in all group matches
Goal difference in all group matches
Greatest number of goals scored in all group matches
Greatest number of points obtained in matches amongst teams still tied
Lots drawn by the Organizing Committee

Division 1

Group A

Group B

Group C

Division 2

Group D

Group E

Group F

Group G

Knockout Stage

Division One

Semi-finals
Source:

Final
Source:

Placements
Source:

Division Two

Semi-finals
Source:

Final
Source:

Placements
Source:

References

External links
 

2018
Girls' U-15 Championship
2018 in women's association football
International association football competitions hosted by the United States